"Scream" is a song by Russian singer Sergey Lazarev. It was Russia's entry at the Eurovision Song Contest 2019 in Tel Aviv, Israel. It was performed during the second semi-final on 16 May, and qualified for the final, where it finished in third place with 370 points.

Eurovision Song Contest

The song represented Russia in the Eurovision Song Contest 2019, after Sergey Lazarev was internally chosen by the Russian broadcaster. On 28 January 2019, a special allocation draw was held which placed each country into one of the two semi-finals, as well as which half of the show they would perform in. Russia was placed into the second semi-final, to be held on 16 May 2019, and was scheduled to perform in the second half of the show. Once all the competing songs for the 2019 contest had been released, the running order for the semi-finals was decided by the show's producers rather than through another draw, so that similar songs were not placed next to each other. Russia performed in position 13 and qualified for the final, where it was performed fifth. It finished in third place with 370 points.

Charts

References

2019 songs
Eurovision songs of 2019
Eurovision songs of Russia
Sergey Lazarev songs
English-language Russian songs